The de Castro surname is used by a Sephardic Jewish family of Portuguese, Spanish and Italian origin. Soon after the establishment of the Portuguese Inquisition, members of the family emigrated to Bordeaux, Bayonne, Hamburg, and various cities in the Netherlands. Their descendants were later to be found scattered throughout Turkey, Egypt, Holland, Germany, England, Italy, United States and Madras. 

Some branches of the family have continued to bear the simple name of de Castro, others are known by de Castro-Osório, de Castro Sarmento, de Castro-Castello-Osório, Pereira de Castro, de Castro Vieira de Pinto, Rodrigues de Castro, Orobio de Castro, de Castro de Paz, Henriques de Castro, etc. The name often appears as "de Crasto." Note that Castro is not in origin Jewish but an Iberian Christian name, adopted by some Portuguese and Spanish Jews after the forced conversions of the late 15th and early 16th centuries. Also in Barranquilla, Santa Marta, Tuluá Valle del Cauca in Colombia and Coro in Venezuela.

Notable members 
Abraham de Castro
Adolphe Danziger De Castro
Isaac Orobio De Castro
 Melba Lozano Lerma De Castro
Kat de Castro
Noli de Castro
Glaiza de Castro
 Samuel de Castro was Founder of De Castro Trading house in Madras.
Saul De Castro Lozano
 Sharon de Castro

See also
 Inquisition
 Marranos
 Crypto-Jews
 Spanish and Portuguese Jews
 Sephardim
 Paradesi Jews

References

References

Jewish families
Portuguese-language surnames
Sephardic surnames
People of Portuguese-Jewish descent